The Covenant Awards are awarded to the Canadian gospel music industry by GMA Canada, the Gospel Music Association of Canada. The association is a nonprofit organization whose mission is to promote the growth and ministry of Christian music in Canada. The ceremonies are held annually in cities across the nation.

History 

GMA Canada created the Covenant Awards in 1974 in Ontario. At the beginning, it was mostly for gospel music. Over the years, all styles of Contemporary Christian music have been included.

In 2008 the association released a special three-CD collection to commemorate its 30th anniversary, the GMA Canada presents 30th Anniversary Collection.

Mission 

GMA Canada works to raise the profile and interaction of Christian artists, songwriters, producers, promoters and others working in Christian music with media, retailers, distributors and church leadership. GMA Canada exists to celebrate excellence in the Canadian Christian Music Industry and to encourage Christian recording artists and proponents in three key areas: Creative artistry, Christian community and Canadian uniqueness. 
 
Creative Artistry' 
We exist to celebrate Canadian Christian artists in a multitude of genres, who are invested in creating music that is rooted in the Gospel, with the goal of reaching and influencing culture. 
 
Christian Community
We exist to encourage everyone within our community to be actively connected to each other, as well as to their local churches. 
 
 Canadian Uniqueness
We exist to inspire a community that celebrates its 'Canadian-ness' and culture with pride and intention.

 Awards 

Covenant Awards are handed out in over 45 categories. One of the most prestigious awards given is the GMA Canada Lifetime Achievement Award.

 GMA Canada 2001 Covenant Award Winners / 23rd annual 

Winners

 Lifetime Achievement Award: Roger & Shirley Pavy of Lighthouse Ministry in Song
 Overcomers Award Recipient: Margaret Williams
 Favourite Female Artist of the Year: Marlene O'Neill
 Favourite Male Artist of the Year: Andrew Martin
 Favourite Instrumentalist Artist of the Year: Warren B. Parker
 Favourite Live Band Artist of the Year: Canada's Double Portion
 Favourite Vocal Group Artist of the Year: Parker Trio
 Favourite Song of the Year: "With Wings As Eagles" - Warren and Shannon Parker
 Contemporary Gospel Album of the Year: Love in the Ruins, Hope in the Wasteland - Lianna Klassen
 Country Album of the Year: Out of His Great Love - Canada's Double Portion
 Inspirational Album of the Year: Just Him, Just Hymns - Andrew Martin
 Pop Album of the Year: Mark Masri - Mark Masri
 Southern Gospel Album of the Year: Encore! - Marlene O'Neill, Joan Elliot
 Contemporary Gospel Song of the Year: "Dwell in the House" - Mark Masri
 Country Song of the Year: "Roll Up Your Sleeves" - David Armstrong
 Pop Song of the Year: "Take My Hand" - Mark Masri, Madeline Stone and Bernie Herms
 Rock Song of the Year: "Out of the Way" - Dan Pascal, Julia Churchill and Adam McKechnie
 Southern Gospel Song of the Year: "Just As I Am" - Rena Gaile
 Disc Jockey/Christian Radio Program: Ben Davy - "The Breakfast Club" (Life 100.3)

 GMA Canada 2002 Covenant Award Winners / 24th Annual 

Winners

 Children's Album of the Year: Everybody Needs Good Manners - Judi Vankevich - The Manners Lady
 Country Album of the Year: Simple Man - Trevor Baker
 Francophone Pop Album of the Year: Juste Au Bon Moment - Tabitha Lemaire
 Inspirational Album of the Year: Because of Love - Kelita
 Instrumental Album of the Year: Anointed Pan - Winston Dayal
 Pop/Contemporary Album of the Year: Waiting For Aidan - Steve Bell
 Rock Album of the Year: Downhere - downhere
 Southern Gospel Album of the Year: I Need You - Andrew Martin
 Urban/Contemporary Gospel Album of the Year: Instrument of Praise - Toronto Mass Choir
 Children's Song of the Year: "The Golden Rule Rap" - Judi Vankevich - The Manners Lady
 Contemporary Gospel Song of the Year: "No Way" - SAJ
 Country Song of the Year: "Through Your Eyes" - Jamus Dorey, songwriter (Four for the Lord)
 Francophone Song of the Year: "Les Roches Crieront" - Luc Gingras
 Inspirational Song of the Year: "Unto The Lord" - Debbie Zepick
 Modern Rock/Alternative Song of the Year: "Freedom" - Manafest
 Pop/Contemporary Song of the Year: "Dance Like No One's Watching" - Carolyn Arends
 Rap/Hip Hop Song of the Year: "Alright" - Promise D'Apostle
 Rock Song of the Year: "Larger Than Life" - downhere
 Southern Gospel Song of the Year: "I Know My God Cares For Me" - Andrew Martin, Ken Harden
 Traditional Gospel Song of the Year: "O Canada" - Trevor Baker
 Disc Jockey/Radio Program of the Year: Bobby Sunday – "Prayz Joynt" (JOY 1250 AM/CJYE)

 GMA Canada 2003 Covenant Award Winners / 25th Annual 

Winners

 Children's Album of the Year: Cry Out - God Rocks!
 Country/Bluegrass Album of the Year: Love Holds On - Mark Mallett
 Francophone Album of the Year: Expression De Louanges - Eglise Sans Frontieres & Friends
 Inspirational Album of the Year: We've Been Waiting For You - Carolyn Arends
 Modern Rock/Alternative Album of the Year: So Much for Substitutes - downhere
 Pop/Contemporary Album of the Year: New Day - Janelle
 Praise & Worship Album of the Year: Forward To Forever - Jody Cross
 Southern Gospel Album of the Year: Love Remains - The Parker Trio
 Children's Song of the Year: "Rocks Cry Out" - Bruce Stacey
 Country/Bluegrass Song of the Year: "Makin' My Way" - Mark Mallett
 Francophone Song of the Year: "Tu Es Le Chant" - Tabitha Lemaire
 Inspirational Song of the Year: "His Hand Upon You" - Jody Cross
 Modern Rock/Alternative Song of the Year: "What It's Like" - downhere
 Pop/Contemporary Song of the Year: "I Believe in You" - The Lapointes
 Praise & Worship Song of the Year: "Humbled" - Jody Cross
 Southern Gospel – Song of the Year: (tie) - "Thank God For Calvary" - The Parker Trio - "You Alone" - Canada's Double Portion

 GMA Canada 2004 Covenant Award Winners / 26th Annual 

Winners

 Lifetime Achievement Award: George Beverly Shea
 Female Vocalist of the Year: Aileen Lombardo
 Male Vocalist of the Year: Greg Sczebel
 Group of the Year: Three Season Ant
 New Artist of the Year: Three Season Ant
 Contemporary Gospel Album of the Year: Keep on Standing - Krystaal
 Country/Bluegrass/Southern Gospel Album of the Year: Hold On - Debbie Forsyth
 Inspirational Album of the Year: Where You Remain - Ali Matthews
 Modern Rock/Alternative Album of the Year: 2 Days After Yesterday - Three Season Ant
 Pop/Contemporary Album of the Year: Taken - Raylene Scarrott
 Rap/Hip Hop/Dance Album of the Year: Red Letterz - Fresh I.E.
 Song of the Year: "If I Believe" - Aileen Lombardo. Kerroy Williams, songwriter
 Contemporary Song of the Year: "Under His Wings" - Aileen Lombardo. Aileen Lombardo, Kerroy Williams, Joy Brown, Roy Oommen, Carmon Barry, Mark Masri, songwriters
 Country/Bluegrass/Southern Gospel Song of the Year: "Hunger Mountain" - Ali Matthews
 Inspirational Song of the Year: "If I Believe" - Aileen Lombardo. Kerroy Williams, songwriter
 Modern Rock/Alternative Song of the Year: "Refusing" - Stereotrap
 Pop/Contemporary Song of the Year: "Thrive" - Bec Abbot
 Praise & Worship Song of the Year: "I Rest" - Three Season Ant, songwriters
 Rap/Hip Hop/Dance Song of the Year: "Lights Are Comin' On" - Greg Sczebel
 Urban Song of the Year: "Noah" - Krystaal

 GMA Canada 2005 Covenant Award Winners / 27th Annual 

Winners

 Lifetime Achievement Award: Tommy Hunter
 Artist of the Year: Thousand Foot Krutch
 Female Vocalist of the Year: Amanda Falk
 Male Vocalist of the Year: Brian Doerksen
 Group of the Year: Thousand Foot Krutch
 New Artist of the Year: Gaetz Ave
 Children's Album of the Year: Movers And Shakers – Outside The Lines
 Contemporary Gospel Album of the Year: Truth – Hetti-Marie
 Country/Bluegrass Album of the Year: Let Go – Cheryl Dunn
 Francophone Album of the Year: Emmène-Moi – Tabitha Lemaire
 Inspirational Album of the Year: Bare My Soul – Kristina
 Instrumental Album of the Year: Road To Home – Brian Thiessen
 Modern Rock Album of the Year: The Art of Breaking – Thousand Foot Krutch
 Pop/Contemporary Album of the Year: Closer to You – Carried Away
 Praise And Worship Album of the Year: Today – Brian Doerksen
 Rap/Hip Hop Album of the Year: Epiphany – Manafest
 Rock Album of the Year: Grasping For Hope in the Darkness – Critical Mass
 Seasonal Album of the Year: An Irrational Season – Carolyn Arends
 Southern Gospel Album of the Year: Live in Havana – Parker Trio
 Special Events/Compilation Album of the Year: Sea to Sea: Filled With Your Glory, Producer Martin Smith
 Song of the Year: "I Know" - Carried Away
 Aboriginal Song of the Year: "Carry Me" - Shezza
 Children's Song of the Year: "Movers And Shakers" - Outside The Lines, Derek Elliotson, songwriters
 Country/Bluegrass Song of the Year: "That's What I Love About Jesus" - Paul Brandt
 Francophone Song of the Year: "Tout c'que je veux" - Tabitha Lemaire
 Inspirational Song of the Year: "Getting Ready For Glory" - Carolyn Arends
 Instrumental Song of the Year: "Ern's Waltz" - Stephanie Mainville
 Modern Rock Song of the Year: "Be My Escape" - Relient K
 Pop/Contemporary Song of the Year: "Here I Go" - Gaetz Ave
 Praise And Worship Song of the Year: "Today" - Brian Doerksen. Brian Doerksen and Sandra Gage songwriters
 Rap/Hip Hop Song of the Year: "Let It Go" - Manafest. Manafest, Gerard Thomas, Adam Messinger, Aubrey Noronha, Nasri, songwriters
 Rock Song of the Year: "No Turning Back" - Travis Blackmore, Robin Ghosh, Mike Kidd, songwriters (Black Talon)
 Seasonal Song of the Year: "On Angels' Wings" - Ali Matthews
 Southern Gospel Song of the Year: "My Faith, My All", The Master's Four. Wendy Pound, songwriter
 Urban Song of the Year: "Everybody" - Greg Sczebel
 Producer of the Year: Glen Teeple

 GMA Canada 2006 Covenant Award Winners / 28th Annual 

Winners

 Lifetime Achievement Award: Connie Scott
 Artist of the Year: Brian Doerksen
 Female Vocalist of the Year: Amanda Falk
 Male Vocalist of the Year: Brian Doerksen
 Group of the Year: Starfield
 New Artist of the Year: The Silent
 Album of the Year: Beauty in the Broken - Starfield
 Country/Bluegrass Album of the Year: Across The Miles - Canada's Double Portion
 Folk/Roots Album of the Year: Window of Light - Ali Matthews
 Francophone Album of the Year: Oasis - Andréanne Lafleur
 Hard Music Album of the Year: More Than Watchmen for the Morning - Means
 Inspirational Album of the Year: Hymns A Modern Translation - Sean and Aimee Dayton
 Instrumental Album of the Year: Another Place - Andrew Bartley
 Jazz/Blues Album of the Year: Beginnings Live - The Mike Janzen Trio
 Modern Rock/Alternative Album of the Year: Smile, It's the End of the World - Hawk Nelson
 Pop/Contemporary Album of the Year: Beauty in the Broken - Starfield
 Praise And Worship Album of the Year: Rekindle - Jody Cross
 Rap/Hip Hop Album of the Year: The Proletariat LP - The Joe
 Rock Album of the Year: Wide-Eyed and Mystified - downhere
 Seasonal Album of the Year: Christmas Presence - Holy Trinity Anglican Church
 Southern Gospel Album of the Year: Here There Or in the Air - The Torchmen Quartet
 Special Events/Compilation Album of the Year: Sea to Sea: I See The Cross - Producer Martin Smith
 Traditional Gospel Album of the Year: The Live Experience - Toronto Mass Choir
 Urban/R&B/Soul Album of the Year: Who Is Like The Lord - Hiram Joseph
 Song of the Year: "Son of God" - Tim Neufeld, Jon Neufeld, Gordon Cochran, songwriters
 Recorded Song of the Year: "A Better Way" - downhere
 Aboriginal Song of the Year: "I Will Exalt" - Shezza
 Children's Song of the Year: "Set An Example" - Bruce Stacey, Ian Tanner
 Country/Bluegrass Song of the Year: "Sweeter Than Wine" - Ali Matthews
 Folk/Roots Song of the Year: "Poised for a Fall" - Ali Matthews
 Francophone Song of the Year: "Le Reflet De Toi" - Andréanne Lafleur
 Hard Music Song of the Year: "You Will Become" - Means
 Inspirational Song of the Year: "When You Shepherd Me" - Brian Doerksen
 Instrumental Song of the Year: "Dancing in the Light" - Fred Cacciotti
 Jazz/Blues Song of the Year: "Marooned" - Sandy Foster
 Modern Rock/Alternative Song of the Year: "Only Hope" - Everyother, songwriters
 Pop/Contemporary Song of the Year: "Not So Hip" - Bec Abbot, Carolyn Arends
 Praise And Worship Song of the Year: "Lord of Every Thing" - Jon Buller
 Rap/Hip Hop Song of the Year: "World Vision" - Fresh I.E.
 Rock Song of the Year: "The More" - downhere
 Seasonal Song of the Year: "Brand New Miracle" - Ali Matthews, Rick Francis, songwriters
 Southern Gospel Song of the Year: "Prayer Changes Things" - Darlene Lemmon, songwriter
 Traditional Gospel Song of the Year: "Wonderful" - Londa Larmond, Jason Larmond, songwriters
 Urban/R&B/Soul Song of the Year: "Shake The Dust" - Adé, Darren Sedor, songwriters
 DVD of the Year: Rez The Rock That Rolled! - God Rocks! BibleToons
 Video of the Year: "Move" - Thousand Foot Krutch
 CD/DVD Artwork Design of the Year: Pollyanna's Attic - Carolyn Arends. Graphic Design by Brent Flink for Indivisual Design Inc.
 Producer of the Year: Stephen Rendall

 GMA Canada 2007 Covenant Award Winners / 29th Annual 

Winners

 Lifetime Achievement Award: Hokus Pick
 Blessings Fan Choice Award: Starfield
 Artist of the Year: Brian Doerksen
 Female Vocalist of the Year: Amanda Falk
 Male Vocalist of the Year: Brian Doerksen
 Group of the Year: Starfield
 New Artist of the Year: Newworldson
 Album of the Year: Holy God - Brian Doerksen
 Country/Bluegrass Album of the Year: Broken Borders - High Valley
 Folk/Roots Album of the Year: Roots Revolution - Newworldson
 Francophone Album of the Year: Peut-Etre - The Kry
 Hard Music Album of the Year: not awarded in 2007
 Inspirational Album of the Year: Free To Worship - Evangeline Inman
 Instrumental Album of the Year: House of Peace - Brian Thiessen
 Jazz/Blues Album of the Year: Destination Unknown - Adam Padfield
 Modern Rock/Alternative Album of the Year: Five Score and Seven Years Ago - Relient K
 Pop/Contemporary Album of the Year: Searching - Sebastian Demrey
 Praise And Worship Album of the Year: Holy God - Brian Doerksen
 Rap/Hip Hop Album of the Year: The Proletariat LP - The Joe
 Rock Album of the Year: Adam Farrell - Adam Farrell
 Seasonal Album of the Year: A Gift - Paul Brandt
 Southern Gospel Album of the Year: An Evening with the Torchmen: Recorded Live at Crossroads Centre - The Torchmen Quartet
 Special Events/Compilation Album of the Year: Sea to Sea: For Endless Days - Producer Martin Smith
 Traditional Gospel Album of the Year: not awarded in 2007
 Urban/R&B/Soul Album of the Year: Oh My Soul - Kathie Morrow
 Song of the Year: "Holy God" - Brian Doerksen
 Recorded Song of the Year: "The Hand That Holds The World" - Starfield
 Aboriginal Song of the Year: "Meegwetch" - Lil' Disciples, R. Wilson and E. Lee songwriters
 Children's Song of the Year: "The Lord Is My Rock" - God Rocks! Bibletoons, Bruce Stacey songwriter
 Country/Bluegrass Song of the Year: "Back To You" - High Valley, Brad Rempel and Brian Barrett songwriters
 Folk/Roots Song of the Year: "Everybody Wants Everything" - Carolyn Arends
 Francophone Song of the Year: "Merveilleux" - The Kry
 Hard Music Song of the Year: "Lifegiver" - Stereotrap
 Inspirational Song of the Year: "Come to the Cross" - Stephanie Israelson. Stephanie Isrealson and Andrew Horrocks songwriters
 Instrumental Song of the Year: "Easter Morning Sunrise" - Debbie Fortnum
 Jazz/Blues Song of the Year: "Loud and Clear" - Christine Magee
 Modern Rock/Alternative Song of the Year: "Must Have Done Something Right" - Relient K
 Pop/Contemporary Song of the Year: "I Want You" - Carried Away
 Praise And Worship Song of the Year: "Holy God" - Brian Doerksen
 Rap/Hip Hop Song of the Year: "Bounce" - Manafest
 Rock Song of the Year: "The Hand That Holds The World" - Starfield. Tim Neufeld, Jon Neufeld, Matt Bronleewe and Jason Ingram songwriters	
 Seasonal Song of the Year: "A Gift" - Paul Brandt
 Southern Gospel Song of the Year: "God's Amazing Grace" - The Master's Four
 Traditional Gospel Song of the Year: not awarded in 2007
 Urban/R&B/Soul Song of the Year: "Shine" - Drew Brown
 Music DVD of the Year: Rock-A-Bye Christmas - God Rocks! Bibletoons
 Video of the Year: "Push" - Christine Evans
 CD/DVD Artwork Design of the Year: Open - Charlene Lewis, Design by Wesley Booker
 Producer of the Year: Roy Salmond

 GMA Canada 2008 Covenant Award Winners / 30th Annual 

Winners

 Lifetime Achievement Award: Rhythm & News
 Blessings Fan Choice Award: Jimmy Lalla
 Artist of the Year: Starfield
 Female Vocalist of the Year: Amanda Falk
 Male Vocalist of the Year: Jon Bauer
 Group of the Year: Starfield
 New Artist of the Year: University of Toronto Gospel Choir
 Album of the Year: I Will Go - Starfield
 Aboriginal Album of the Year: The Good Road - Cheryl Bear
 Children's Album of the Year: Trust And Hope in the Lord - God Rocks! BibleToons
 Choir Album of the Year: A cappella - Rocky Mountain College Choir
 Classical/Traditional Album of the Year: The Hymn Project - Buller, Balzer & Aichele
 Country/Bluegrass Album of the Year: In The Sweet By And By - Jayc Harold
 Folk/Roots Album of the Year: Salvation Station - Newworldson
 Francophone Album of the Year: Aimer Comme Toi - Claude Whiting
 Gospel Album of the Year: Send Me - University of Toronto Gospel Choir
 Hard Music Album of the Year: Great White Whale - Secret and Whisper
 Inspirational Album of the Year: Fountain of Life - 4Given
 Instrumental Album of the Year: What A Gig That Will Be - Bruce Dougall
 Jazz/Blues Album of the Year: The Essence of Life - Zoë Theodorou
 Modern Rock/Alternative Album of the Year: To The Living - Jay and the Lovebirds
 Modern Worship Album of the Year: I Will Go - Starfield
 Pop/Contemporary Album of the Year: Colors And Sounds - Article One
 Praise And Worship Album of the Year: Empty & Beautiful - Matt Maher
 Rap/Hip Hop Album of the Year: Lockjaw - Fresh I.E.
 Rock Album of the Year: Reset & Rewind - Manic Drive
 Seasonal Album of the Year: This Christmas - Jacob Moon
 Southern Gospel Album of the Year: I Believe - Three And Company
 Special Events/Compilation Album of the Year: GMA Canada presents 30th Anniversary Collection - Producer Martin Smith
 Urban/R&B/Soul Album of the Year: Seguro En Ti - Paulis Sanchez
 Song of the Year: "Love Is The Anchor" - Greg Sczebel
 Recorded Song of the Year: "Hosanna" - Starfield
 Aboriginal Song of the Year: "Residential School Song" - Cheryl Bear
 Children's Song of the Year: "The Plans I Have" - Ian Tanner (God Rocks! BibleToons)
 Choir Song of the Year: "I Surrender" - Stephen Lewis, University of Toronto Gospel Choir
 Classical/Traditional Song of the Year: "I Will Give You All The Praise" - 4Given - Monica Cota, Evangeline Inman and Mark Inman songwriters
 Country/Bluegrass Song of the Year: "The Prayer Song" - Steve Rain & Friends
 Folk/Roots Song of the Year: "On The Blue" - Joel Augé
 Francophone Song of the Year: "Pour Te Louer" - Catherine Grenier
 Gospel Song of the Year: "Because of You" - Ryan Resmer
 Hard Music Song of the Year: "Xoxoxo" - Secret and Whisper
 Inspirational Song of the Year: "Trust" - Adam Padfield
 Instrumental Song of the Year: "The Cry of Bethlehem" - Ali Matthews
 Jazz/Blues Song of the Year: "I Believed It" - Zoë Theodorou. Zoë Theodorou, Eric Boseman, Viviane Cardinal, Rodney Hunter, Daniel Martin, Rique Pantoje and Gavin Sorochan songwriters
 Modern Rock/Alternative Song of the Year: "Anyways" - Everyother
 Modern Worship Song of the Year: "Faithful Forever" - Elias Dummer
 Pop/Contemporary Song of the Year: "Beautiful" - Amanda Falk (Amanda Lindsey Cook. Malynda Zacharias, Marshall Zacharias and Amanda Falk songwriters
 Praise And Worship Song of the Year: "Reign in Us" - (Starfield). Ben Glover, Jon Neufeld and Tim Neufeld songwriters 
 Rap/Hip Hop Song of the Year: "Heat" - Rob James, (Fresh I.E.)
 Rock Song of the Year: "Alone Tonight" - Kiros
 Seasonal Song of the Year: "The Cry of Bethlehem" - Ali Matthews
 Southern Gospel Song of the Year: "Walk Out on the Water" - One Heart. Don Wilkie songwriter
 Urban/R&B/Soul Song of the Year: "Me Tienes (You Got Me)" - Paulis Sanchez. Paulis Sanchez, Terverius Black, Sean Simmonds and Kelvin Wooten songwriters
 Music DVD of the Year: One - Victory Christian Centre
 Video of the Year: "Eleven Regrets" - Manic Drive
 CD/DVD Artwork Design of the Year: The Hymn Project - Buller, Balzer & Aichele. Brian Kauste songwriter
 Producer of the Year: Dave Zeglinski and Steve Bell

 GMA Canada 2009 Covenant Award Winners / 31st Annual 

Winners

 Lifetime Achievement Award: Gerry Scott
 Blessings Fan Choice Award: Matt Brouwer
 Artist of the Year: downhere
 Female Vocalist of the Year: Janelle
 Male Vocalist of the Year: Joel Augé
 Group of the Year: Newworldson
 New Artist of the Year: Chris Bray
 Album of the Year: Ending Is Beginning - downhere
 Children's Album of the Year: Giver of Grace - Jon Bauer
 Classical/Traditional Album of the Year: Fields of Gold - Jeffrey Allan Sawatzky
 Country/Bluegrass Album of the Year: You Carry Me - Brenda Janz
 Folk/Roots Album of the Year: No Sudden Movements - Corey Doak
 Francophone Album of the Year: Authenticité - Andréanne (Andréanne Lafleur)
 Gospel Album of the Year: Ain't That Good News - Black Pioneer Heritage Singers
 Inspirational Album of the Year: Evangeline Inman & Women Who Worship Instrumental Album of the Year: A Quiet Afternoon - Tisha Murvihill
 Jazz/Blues Album of the Year: Mombâcho - Mike Janzen Trio
 Modern Rock/Alternative Album of the Year: The Bird and the Bee Sides/The Nashville Tennis EP - Relient K
 Modern Worship Album of the Year: Love Is A Fire - Fridays Cry
 Pop/Contemporary Album of the Year: Ending Is Beginning - downhere
 Praise And Worship Album of the Year: Glory - Klaus
 Rap/Hip Hop Album of the Year: More Than Music - Promise
 Rock Album of the Year: Living And Surviving - Red Umbrella
 Seasonal Album of the Year: Looking For Christmas - Ali Matthews
 Southern Gospel Album of the Year: It Takes Faith - Hunter Brothers
 Special Events/Compilation Album of the Year: Women's Journey of Faith - BU Girl
 Urban/R&B/Soul Album of the Year: Divine Conversations Volume I - Jennifer Meade
 Song of the Year: "Here I Am" - downhere
 Recorded Song of the Year: "Here I Am" - downhere
 Children's Song of the Year: "Show Me The Way" - The Toronto Children's Concert Choir
 Choir Song of the Year: "Wonderful" - Evangeline Inman & Women Who Worship. Evangeline Inman and Mark Inman songwriters
 Classical/Traditional Song of the Year: "Alleluia, Alleluia (Psalm 84)" - Gemma and Co. (Karin Dart, Cathy Hardy)
 Country/Bluegrass Song of the Year: "King of the World" - Point of Grace. Cindy Morgan songwriter
 Folk/Roots Song of the Year: "The Other Side" - Matt Brouwer feat Amy Grant and Vince Gill. Matt Brouwer songwriter
 Francophone Song of the Year: "Comblé" - Andréanne (Andréanne Lafleur)
 Gospel Song of the Year: "O Taste And See" - Evangeline Inman & Women Who Worship
 Inspirational Song of the Year: "The Beggar Who Gives Alms" - downhere
 Instrumental Song of the Year: "Eastern Grace" - Jasmin Gibb
 Jazz/Blues Song of the Year: "Embrace The Mystery" - Steve Bell, Gord Johnson songwriter
 Modern Rock/Alternative Song of the Year: "Live Life Loud" - Hawk Nelson (Hawk Nelson)
 Modern Worship Song of the Year: "No Mountain" - Fridays Cry
 Pop/Contemporary Song of the Year: "Here I Am" - downhere
 Praise And Worship Song of the Year: "It's Time for the Reign of God" - Brian Doerksen. Brian Doerksen and Steve Mitchinson songwriters
 Rap/Hip Hop Song of the Year: "4-3-2-1" - Manafest. Manafest (Chris Greenwood) and Adam Messinger songwriters
 Rock Song of the Year: "My Last Amen" - downhere
 Seasonal Song of the Year: "How Many Kings" - downhere
 Southern Gospel Song of the Year: "God's Game Plan" - Hunter Brothers
 Urban/R&B/Soul Song of the Year: "You" - Fresh I.E.
 Music DVD of the Year: God Rocks! The Music Videos - God Rocks!
 Video of the Year: "Crystal" - Fresh I.E.
 CD/DVD Artwork Design of the Year: Find Me/Blessed Are the Lost Ones - David John Hensman
 Producer of the Year: Philip Janz

 GMA Canada 2010 Covenant Award Winners / 32nd Annual 

Winners

 Lifetime Achievement Award: Arlen Salte
 Blessings Fan Choice Award: Greg Sczebel
 Song of the Year: "Hold Us Together" - Matt Maher. Matt Maher and Steve Wilson songwriters
 Recorded Song of the Year: "There Is A Way" - Newworldson
 Producer of the Year: Andrew Horrocks
 New Artist of the Year: Junkyard Poets
 Male Vocalist of the Year: Greg Sczebel
 Female Vocalist of the Year: Stephanie Israelson
 Group of the Year: downhere
 Artist of the Year: Starfield
 Album of the Year: Alive Again - Matt Maher
 CD/DVD Artwork Design of the Year: Love Was Here First - Carolyn Arends. Brian Kauste songwriter
 Urban/R&B/Soul Song of the Year: "Heaven" - Jason Ray
 Urban/R&B/Soul Album of the Year: Anchored Roots - Chelsea Nisbett
 Special Events/Compilation of the Year: Sea to Sea: Christmas - Producer Martin Smith
 Southern Gospel Song of the Year: "Gonna Get My Feet Wet" - The Torchmen Quartet. David Randall songwriter
 Southern Gospel Album of the Year: I'll Follow You - Father's Daughter
 Seasonal Song of the Year: "Christmas in Our Hearts" - downhere
 Seasonal Album of the Year: How Many Kings: Songs for Christmas - downhere
 Rock Song of the Year: "Forward Motion" - Thousand Foot Krutch
 Rock Album of the Year: Welcome to the Masquerade - Thousand Foot Krutch
 Rap/Hip Hop Song of the Year: "Homeless" - Fresh I.E. Robert Wilson and Byron Foster songwriters
 Rap/Hip Hop Album of the Year: The Chase - Manafest
 Praise And Worship Song of the Year: "Alive Again" - Matt Maher. Matt Maher and Jason Ingram songwriters
 Praise And Worship Album of the Year: Alive Again - Matt Maher
 Pop/Contemporary Song of the Year: "There Is A Way" - Newworldson Newworldson and Tawgs Salter songwriters
 Pop/Contemporary Album of the Year: Love & the Lack Thereof - Greg Sczebel
 Modern Worship Song of the Year: "Glory Is Rising" - Starfield. Chris Janz, Tim Neufeld, Jon Neufeld and Ian Eskelin songwriters
 Modern Worship Album of the Year: The Saving One - Starfield
 Modern Rock/Alternative Song of the Year: "Never Enough" - Hawk Nelson. Hawk Nelson and Trevor McNevan songwriters
 Modern Rock/Alternative Album of the Year: Live Life Loud - Hawk Nelson
 Jazz/Blues Song of the Year: "No Compromise" - Sean Spicer, featuring Mike Janzen
 Instrumental Song of the Year: "Passion" -  Trevor Dick and the 5th String Blvd. Band. Trevor Dick songwriter
 Instrumental Album of the Year: Yahweh - Trevor Dick and the 5th String Blvd. Band.
 Inspirational Song of the Year: "Hold On" - Mark Masri. Mark Masri, Adam Crossley and John Acosta songwriters
 Inspirational Album of the Year: Into Your Light - The Wiebes
 Hard Music Song of the Year: "Bring Me To Life" - Thousand Foot Krutch
 Gospel/Caribbean Album of the Year: Life - Zamar
 Francophone Song of the Year: "Que Tout Ce Qui Respire" - Geneviève Falleur. Geneviève Falleur and Sebastian Demrey songwriters
 Francophone Album of the Year: Dès Le Réveil - Geneviève Falleur
 Folk-Roots Song of the Year: "Be Still" - Carolyn Arends
 Folk-Roots Album of the Year: Newworldson - Newworldson
 Country/Bluegrass Song of the Year: "Holding On" - Denise Gerein
 Country/Bluegrass Album of the Year: Blessings - Barb Prosser Winder
 Classical/Traditional Song of the Year: "Time" - Mark Masri feat Nita Whitaker. Mark Masri and Amy Sky songwriters
 Classical/Traditional Album of the Year: La Voce - Mark Masri
 Choir Song of the Year: "Walk in Jerusalem Just Like John" - Lincoln Tatem
 Children's Song of the Year: "Peace, Peace, Peace" - Dian Layton. Dian Layton and Lori Hubschmid songwriters
 Children's Album of the Year: God Rocks My World - God Rocks!
 Aboriginal Song of the Year: "Hand in Hand" - Yvonne St. Germaine
 Aboriginal Album of the Year: Roots - Dorothy Mae
 Video of the Year: "I Will Come" - Greg Sczebel
 Music DVD of the Year: God Rocks! Live in Miami - God Rocks!

 GMA Canada 2011 Covenant Award Winners / 33rd Annual 

Winners

 Lifetime Achievement Award: Daniel Band
 Blessings Fan Choice Award: Tenore
 Song of the Year: "Let Me Rediscover You" - downhere
 Recorded Song of the Year: "Manifesto" - The City Harmonic
 Producer of the Year: Andrew Horrocks
 New Artist of the Year: The City Harmonic
 Male Vocalist of the Year: Matt Maher
 Female Vocalist of the Year: Ali Matthews
 Group of the Year: High Valley
 Artist of the Year: High Valley
 Album of the Year: Carry Me Home - Ali Matthews
 CD/DVD Artwork Design of the Year: Carry Me Home - Ali Matthews
 Urban/R&B/Soul Song of the Year: "Circling Numbers" - Manuela
 Urban/R&B/Soul Album of the Year: Songs From The Evolution of Gospel Music - Toronto Mass Choir
 Special Events/Compilation of the Year: Prodigal God - Brian Doerksen
 Seasonal Song of the Year: "What A Boy" - Stephanie Mainville (Stephanie Mainville)
 Seasonal Album of the Year: A Christmas Gift - Toronto Mass Choir
 Rock Song of the Year: "Crazy Love" - Hawk Nelson
 Rock Album of the Year: Crazy Love - Hawk Nelson
 Rap/Hip Hop Song of the Year: "Avalanche" - Manafest
 Rap/Hip Hop Album of the Year: Live in Concert - Manafest
 Praise And Worship Song of the Year: "Welcome to the Level Ground" - Brian Doerksen. Brian Doerksen and Paul Baloche songwriters
 Praise And Worship Album of the Year: Level Ground - Brian Doerksen
 Pop/Contemporary Song of the Year: "One Step Away" - WakeUp Starlight
 Pop/Contemporary Album of the Year: Two at a Time - downhere
 Modern Worship Song of the Year: "Manifesto" - The City Harmonic
 Modern Worship Album of the Year: Let Hope Arise - Chris Bray
 Modern Rock/Alternative Song of the Year: "Tonight" - Sky Terminal
 Modern Rock/Alternative Album of the Year: Lukewarm Love - Cities Under Fire
 Jazz/Blues Song of the Year: "There's No Escaping Spring" - Mike Janzen Trio
 Instrumental Song of the Year: "Rejoice in Hope" - Sean Spicer
 Instrumental Album of the Year: Olive Tree - Sean Spicer
 Inspirational Song of the Year: "Pursue Me" - Chris Bray
 Inspirational Album of the Year: Songs for the Journey: The Story Goes On - Lianna Klassen
 Gospel/Caribbean Song of the Year: "Oh Come All Ye Faithful" - Toronto Mass Choir
 Folk/Roots Song of the Year: "God Only Knows" - Ali Matthews
 Folk/Roots Album of the Year: TIE - The Last Goodbye - Rob Berg / Kindness - Steve Bell
 Country/Bluegrass Song of the Year: "A Father's Love (The Only Way He Knew How)" - High Valley
 Country/Bluegrass Album of the Year: High Valley - High Valley
 Classical/Traditional Song of the Year: "Sempre Vicino: Prayer For Peace" - Tenore
 Classical/Traditional Album of the Year: SING! Presents Tenore - Tenore
 Children's Song of the Year: "Giver of Grace" - Jon Bauer
 Aboriginal Song of the Year: "Tennessee Sky" - Yvonne St. Germaine
 Video of the Year: "A Father's Love (The Only Way He Knew How)" - High Valley
 Music DVD of the Year: Level Ground: The Live Experience - Brian Doerksen

 GMA Canada 2012 Covenant Award Winners / 34th Annual 

Winners

 Lifetime Achievement Award: Toronto Mass Choir
 Blessings Fan Choice Award: Open Sky
 Aboriginal Song of the Year: "A' BA", Cheryl Bear
Album of the Year: On the Altar of Love - downhere
Artist of the Year: High Valley
CD Artwork of the Year: The Color - The Color - Art Direction by Melanie Greenwood at Vision City
Children's Album of the Year: Here We Go - Q-Town
Children's Song of the Year: "Chasing After Me" - Jon Bauer
Classical/Traditional Song of the Year: "Silent Night" - Sean and Aimee Dayton with Brian Doerksen
Collaboration of the Year: "Join Together" by Scott Towaij with Amy Savin, Ali Matthews, Sean Dayton, Dana Marie, Chris Bray and Colin Bernard
Country/Bluegrass Album of the Year: Love Is A Long Road - High Valley
Country/Bluegrass Song of the Year: "Have I Told You I Love You Lately" - High Valley
Female Vocalist of the Year: Ali Matthews
Folk/Roots Album of the Year: Rebel Transmission - Newworldson
Folk/Roots Song of the Year: "Worry" as recorded by Cindy Morgan
Francophone Album of the Year: Heritage: Cantiques & Hymnes Volume II - Sebastian Demrey & Jimmy Lahaie
Francophone Song of the Year: "L'Amour Manifeste" - Evaymé
Gospel/Caribbean Album of the Year: Great Things - Londa Larmond
Gospel/Caribbean Song of the Year: "Quoi qu'il arrive" - Jireh Gospel Choir
Group of the Year: downhere
Hard Rock/Alternative Album of the Year: Epic - Manic Drive
Hard Rock/Alternative Song of the Year: "Alive" - The Color - James Shiels, Jordan Janzen, Gabe Boschmann and Jay Tooke songwriters
Inspirational Album of the Year: The Hymns Collection - The Wiebes
Inspirational Song Song of the Year: "Ocean" - Matt Brouwer
Instrumental Album of the Year: Here Is Love - Marcel Preston and Jonathan Clarke
Instrumental Song of the Year: "Lift Your Hands" - Rockn Ron Project
Jazz/Blues Song of the Year: "The Lion" - Derek Gust
Male Vocalist of the Year: Marc Martel
Modern Worship Album of the Year: Everything in Color - Ben Cantelon
Modern Worship Song of the Year: "The Kingdom" as recorded - Starfield
New Artist of the Year: The Color
Pop/Contemporary Album of the Year: The Love in Between - Matt Maher
Pop/Contemporary Song of the Year: "Learning To Be The Light" - Newworldson
Praise & Worship Album of the Year: Forevermore - Jon Bauer
Praise & Worship Song of the Year: "I Have A Dream (It Feels Like Home)" - The City Harmonic
Producer of the Year: Sebastian Demrey
Rap/Hip Hop Album: City of Worship by Fresh I.E.
Rap/Hip Hop Song of the Year: "God of This City" - Fresh I.E.
Recorded Song of the Year: "Never Let You Go" - Manafest
Rock/Modern Album of the Year: Until the Sun Comes Out Again - Open Sky
Rock/Modern Rock Song of the Year: "War of Change" - Thousand Foot Krutch
Seasonal Album of the Year: A Living Room Christmas - Sean and Aimee Dayton
Seasonal Song of the Year: "Bethlehem" - Crosswalk With Ray Lyell
Song of the Year: "Learning to Be the Light" - Newworldson
Southern Gospel Album of the Year: Step Up - The Torchmen Quartet
Southern Gospel Song of the Year: "I Wanna Go" - The Amundruds 
Special Events Album of the Year: Kingdom Come - Worship Victoria
Urban/R&B/Soul Album of the Year: Beautiful Disaster - Fresh I.E.
Urban/R&B/Soul/Song of the Year: "Shake Holy Spirit" - Newworldson
Video of the Year: "Dans mon âme un beau soleil brille" - Sebastian Demrey & Jimmy Lahaie

 GMA Canada 2013 Covenant Award Winners / 35th Annual 

 Lifetime Achievement Award: Servant
 Lifetime Achievement Award: Lando Klassen, House of James bookstore
 Blessings Fan Choice Award: Open Sky
 Album of the Year: Just As I Am - Paul Brandt
 Artist of the Year: Paul Brandt
 Female Vocalist of the Year: Ali Matthews
 Male Vocalist of the Year: Dan Bremnes
 New Artist of the Year: Love & the Outcome
 Producer of the Year: Andrew Horrocks
 Group of the Year: The City Harmonic
 Collaboration of the Year: "I Saw Jesus" - Ali Matthews, Joel Augé, Marcel Preston, Kevin Pauls and Matthew Grieves
 Song of the Year: "He Is With Us" - Love & the Outcome
 Recorded Song of the Year: "He Is With Us" - Love & the Outcome
 Inspirational Song of the Year: "I Saw Jesus" - Ali Matthews
 Children's Song of the Year: "Come And Save Us" - Jon Bauer
 Classical/Traditional Song of the Year: "O Come O Come Emmanuel" - Sean and Aimee Dayton
 Country/Bluegrass Song of the Year: "Just in Time" - Canada's Double Portion
 Folk/Roots Song of the Year: "Our Cozy Apartment" - Keith Kitchen
 Francophone Song of the Year: "Ma Promesse" - Olivier Voyer with Andreanne Lafleur
 Gospel/Caribbean Song of the Year: "Air That I Breathe" - Prosper & GPM
 Alternative Rock Song of the Year: "World at War" - Junkyard Poets
 Instrumental Song of the Year: "Do You Want It?" - Josh Lake
 Jazz/Blues Song of the Year: "Swing Low" - G.B. Roots
 Modern Rock Song of the Year: "Inside Out" - Anthem For Today
 Praise And Worship Song of the Year: "Holy (Wedding Day)" - The City Harmonic
 Rap/Hip Hop Song of the Year: "Beautiful Mess" - RationaL
 Seasonal Song of the Year: "It's Still Christmas" - Colin Bernard
 Southern Gospel Song of the Year: "Don't Forget About The Cross" - The Master's Four
 Pop/Contemporary Song of the Year: "He Is With Us" - Love & the Outcome
 Urban/R&B/Soul Song of the Year: "I Still Need You" - Fresh I.E. feat AJ
 International Song of the Year: "Whom Shall I Fear" - Chris Tomlin
 Children's Album of the Year: Live It Up - Q-Town
 Country/Bluegrass Album of the Year: Just As I Am - Paul Brandt
 Folk/Roots Album of the Year: Roots of Worship - Jon Bauer
 Francophone Album of the Year: L'Aube D'Un Jour Nouveau - Olivier Voyer
 Gospel/Caribbean Album of the Year: Takeover - Prosper & GPM
 Inspirational Album of the Year: Overwhelm Us - Brad Guldemond
 Instrumental Album of the Year: Melodic Twilight - Scott Pettipas
 Modern Worship Album of the Year: Trees - Tim Neufeld
 Pop/Contemporary Album of the Year: Unstoppable - Marika
 Praise Album of the Year: All the People Said Amen - Matt Maher
 Urban/R&B/Soul/Rap Album of the Year: Red Letterz13 - Fresh I.E.
 Special Events/Compilation of the Year: This Is Our Love - Jody Cross
 Jazz/Blues Album of the Year: Nuthin' But a Man - A.J.
 Rock/Modern Rock Album of the Year: Mrs. Sophomore - Junkyard Poets
 Seasonal Album of the Year: Songs of Christmas Volume 1 - Starfield
 Southern Gospel Album of the Year: New Perspective - The Torchmen Quartet
 CD/DVD Artwork of the Year: All Is Not Lost, Flood the Stone - Wayne Pashley
 Music Video of the Year: "This Life" - Dan Bremnes

 GMA Canada 2014 Covenant Award Winners / 36th Annual 

 Lifetime Achievement Award: Brian Doerksen
 Album of the Year: Love & The Outcome – Love & the Outcome
 Artist of the Year: Dan Bremnes
 Male Vocalist of the Year: Dan Bremnes
 Female Vocalist of the Year: Amanda Lindsey Cook
 New Artist of the Year: The Royal Foundry
 Group of the Year: Love & the Outcome
 Producer of the Year: Jared Salte
 Song of the Year: "You Make Me Brave" - Amanda Lindsey Cook
 Recorded Song of the Year: "Beautiful" - Dan Bremnes
 Collaboration of the Year: "This is Love" - Ali Matthews & Joel Augé 
 Aboriginal Song of the Year: "Stay Strong" - Yvonne St. Germaine
 Children's Album of the Year: Right Here Right Now - Q-Town
 Children's Song of the Year: "Good Life" - Russ Smith & Rick Colhoun 
 Country/Southern Gospel Album of the Year: Hymns: Lest We Forget - The Torchmen Quartet
 Country/Bluegrass Song of the Year: "What I've Learned So Far" - Brad Rempel (High Valley) & Victoria Banks 
 Folk Album of the Year: Tell Me a Story - Ali Matthews
 Folk/Roots Song of the Year: "Love" - The Royal Foundry
 Francophone Album of the Year: Heritage Cantiques & Hymnes Vol. 3 - Sebastian Demrey & Jimmy Lahaie
 Francophone Song of the Year: "Par Un Sourire" - Evaymé
 Gospel Album of the Year: Made For Worship - Toronto Mass Choir 
 Gospel Song of the Year: "Made for Worship" - Jenna Burke
 Inspirational Album of the Year: Songs for the Journey Volume One - The SHIYR Poets
 Inspirational Song of the Year: "Faithful" - Greg Sykes & Joel Augé 
 Instrumental Song of the Year: "Heaven's Joy" - Debbie Fortnum
 International Album of the Year: The Art of Celebration - Rend Collective
 International Song of the Year: "My Lighthouse" - Rend Collective
 Jazz/Blues Song of the Year: "Give Me One Good Reason" - Andrew Jaehn & Rudy Fast
 Pop/Contemporary Song of the Year: "Beautiful" - Dan Bremnes 
 Praise And Worship Album of the Year: Kingdom Come - Bryan & Katie Torwalt
 Praise And Worship Song of the Year: "You Make Me Brave" - Amanda Lindsey Cook 
 Rap Album of the Year: The Watchmen - KMF feat Young Scribe, Psalms & Fresh I.E.
 Rap Song of the Year: "The City is Fallen" - KMF feat Young Scribe, Psalms & Fresh I.E.
 Rock Album of the Year: We Are One - Sky Terminal
 Rock Song of the Year: "Diamonds" - Manafest & Trevor McNevan
 Seasonal Album of the Year: Christmas with You - Tenore 
 Seasonal Song of the Year: "Emmanuel" - Love & the Outcome
 Southern Gospel Song of the Year: - "Your Love" - Canada's Double Portion
 Urban Song of the Year: "More Than Beautiful" - Rachelle Luk. Rachelle Luk and Mike Klose songwriters
 Video of the Year: - "Dieu Tout Puissant" - Sebastian Demrey & Jimmy Lahaie
 CD/DVD Artwork of the Year: - Search The Heavens - Fraser Campbell (Design by Fraser Campbell, Liz Snell, Justine McHale and Ian McHale)

 GMA Canada 2015 Covenant Award Winners / 37th Annual 

 Lifetime Achievement Award: Roy Salmond
 Album of the Year: Saints And Sinners Matt Maher
 Artist of the Year: Fresh I.E.
 Female Vocalist of the Year: Chelsea Amber
 Male Vocalist of the Year: Drew Brown
 Group of the Year: The City Harmonic
 New Artist of the Year: The Informants
 Producer of the Year: Andrew Horrocks
 Album Artwork of the Year: Pilgrimage - Steve Bell - Design by Roberta Hansen
 Video of the Year: Diamond in the Rough (Acoustic) - Chelsea Amber
 Song of the Year: "Come Alive" - Jon Neufeld. Jon Neufeld and Allen Salmon songwriters
 Recorded Song of the Year:  "I'm Free" - Tim Neufeld & The Glory Boys
 Collaboration of the Year: Collide (City of Worship 2) - Fresh I.E. with Paul Brandt, The Color, Cynthia Hamar, The City Harmonic, Fraser Campbell, Tasman Jude, Scribe, Cote, One8Tea, Tuzil, Jon Loeppky and Matt Gilman 
 Children's Album of the Year: Let It Out! - Brad Guldemond
 Country Album of the Year: Sweetest Sound - The Amundruds 
 Folk Album of the Year: Pilgrimage - Steve Bell 
 Francophone Album of the Year: Heritage Cantiques de Noel - Sebastian Demrey & Jimmy Lahaie
 Gospel Album of the Year: Get Up - Jireh Gospel Choir
 Inspirational Album of the Year: Arise O Sleeper - The Wiebes 
 Instrumental Album of the Year: New World - Trevor Dick Band
 Jazz/Blues Album of the Year: All The Way Live - Newworldson
 Pop Album of the Year: Introducing Chelsea Amber, Chelsea Amber
 Praise & Worship Album of the Year: Living Waters - Marcel & Ruth Preston
 Rap Album of the Year: Real Life - Malachi
 Rock Album of the Year: VIP - Manic Drive
 Seasonal Album of the Year: 40cm of Funk - Josh Lake
 Southern Gospel Album of the Year: Run Through The Gates - The Torchmen Quartet
 Aboriginal Song of the Year: "Rise Again" - Treneta Bowden. Treneta Bowden and Sean Spicer songwriters
 Children's Song of the Year: "Every Kid in the House Tonight" - Rick Colhoun & Russ Smith 
 Country Song of the Year: "Under Stars" - Coalmont
 Folk Song of the Year: "Count Me In" - Rob Berg
 Francophone Song of the Year: "Libère-moi de moi-même", Luc Dumont
 Gospel Song of the Year: "But Your Praise" - Derin Bello. Derin Bello and Andrew Horrocks songwriters
 Inspirational Song of the Year: "I Am Not" - Rachelle Luk. Rachelle Luk and Mike Klose songwriters
 Instrumental Song of the Year: "You Are Holy" - Ron Fischer
 Jazz/Blues Song of the Year: "Awaken My Love" - Sean Spicer
 Pop Song of the Year: "One Sure Thing" - The Color. Tony Wood, Rusty Varenkamp, James Shiels and Jordan Janzen songwriters
 Praise and Worship Song of the Year: "Waiting on You" - Glenn Vincent Breen and Michael Rossback songwriters
 Rap Song of the Year: "Broken Veil" - Fresh I.E. Robert Wilson, Elias Dummer, Eric Fusilier, Aaron Powell and Josh Vanderlaan songwriters
 Rock Song of the Year: "Run" - West of Here
 Seasonal Song of the Year: "What Kind of King" - Carolyn Arends
 Urban Song of the Year: "Diamond in the Rough" - Chelsea Amber. Chelsea Amber and Paul Colman songwriters.

 GMA Canada 2017 Covenant Award Winners / 38th Annual 

 Lifetime Achievement Award: Martin Smith
 Album of The Year: Exhale - Thousand Foot Krutch
 Artist of the Year: Tim Neufeld
 Group of The Year: Tim Neufeld and the Glory Boys
 Female Vocalist of The Year: Charmaine Brown
 Male Vocalist of The Year: Matt Maher
 New Artist of The Year: Mat & Nicole Crisp
 Producer of The Year: Drew Brown
 Recorded Song of The Year: "What I Would Say To You" - The Color
 Song of The Year: "You Are With Me" - Andrew Marcus. Andrew Marcus, Paul Baloche and Scott Cash songwriters
 Collaboration of The Year: "Story" - Ali Matthews feat Tim Neufeld
 Video of The Year: "What I Would Say To You" - The Color
 CD/DVD Artwork Design: A New Direction - Jon Corbin. Design by Jermaine Wall
 Children's Album of The Year: Happy Beach - Perry Springman
 Children's Song of The Year: "As For Me and My House" - Dan Macaulay
 Folk Album of The Year: Bows & Arrows - Cindy Morgan
 Folk Song of The Year: "In the Stillness" - Ali Matthews
 Gospel Album of The Year: No One Else - Ayo Oni
 Gospel Song of The Year: "Joy!" - Warren Dean Flandez feat. Top Line Vocal Collective. Warren Dean Flandez, Karolyn Volbek and Jamie Kuse songwriters
 Inspirational Album of The Year: Songs for the Journey Volume Two - The SHIYR Poets
 Inspirational Song of The Year: "Where the Sidewalk Ends" - Jon Bauer. Jon Bauer and Rusty Varenkamp songwriters
 Instrumental Album of The Year: Unchanging Grace - Steve Wingfield
 Instrumental Song of The Year: "Rise Again" - Sean Spicer & Treneta Bowden
 Praise & Worship Album of The Year: Champion - Bryan & Katie Torwalt
 Praise & Worship Song of The Year: "Glory to His Name" - Andrew Marcus
 Rap Album of The Year: Reverence - One8Tea
 Rap Song of The Year: "10,000 Angels" - Ezekiel Feat. Fresh I.E. Ezekiel McMurtry and Robert Wilson songwriters
 Seasonal Album of The Year: Christmas Time - The Quintons
 Seasonal Song of The Year: "Emmanuel"	- Ali Matthews
 Southern Gospel/Country Album of The Year: Emmanuel God With Us - The Torchmen Quartet
 Country Song of The Year: "What's Life All About"	- Andy Taylor
 Jazz/Blues Song of The Year: "Long Lonely Road" - Andy Taylor
 Pop Song of The Year: "What I Would Say To You" - The Color. Jordan Janzen, James Shiels, Rusty Varenkamp, Aaron Rice songwriters
 Rock Song of The Year: "Alive in Us" - Mark Steinbrenner
 Urban Song of The Year: "Never Dim My Light"	- Warren Dean Flandez feat Terrance Richmond.
 The World Vision Artist Collective Humanitarian Award: David Ruis

 GMA Canada 2018 Covenant Award Winners / 39th Annual 

 Lifetime Achievement Award: Industry - Dave Zeglinski
 Lifetime Achievement Award: Artist - Steve Bell
 Album of The Year: Where the Good Way Lies - Steve Bell
 Artist of the Year: The Color
 CD/DVD Artwork Design: Orbits - Keith Kitchen, Brent & Caroline Flink, Flink Creative
 Collaboration of The Year: Where the Good Way Lies - Steve Bell, Fresh I.E., Ray "Coco" Stevenson
 Country Song of the Year: "Rest in Me" - Jaylene Johnson
 Female Vocalist of The Year: Brooke Nicholls
 Folk Album of The Year: Orbits - Keith Kitchen
 Folk Song of The Year: "Joy (Oh There She Goes)" - Fraser Campbell
 Francophone Album of the Year: Rendez-Vous - Emilie Charette
 Francophone Song of the Year: "Tant Que Je Respirerai" - Timothé Beaulieu
 Gospel Album of The Year: Eternally Grateful - Warren Dean Flandez
 Gospel Song of The Year: "Pray - Pray Again" - Jaylene Johnson
 Group of The Year: The Color
 Inspirational Album of The Year: Reverse - Greg Sykes
 Inspirational Song of The Year: "Wait Alone in Stillness" - Steve Bell
 Instrumental Album of The Year: Hymns for the Seasons - Steve Wingfield
 Instrumental Song of The Year: "The Newborn King" - Drew Brown
 International Album of the Year: Let There Be Light - Hillsong Worship
 International Song of the Year: "Even If" - MercyMe. Bart Millard, Ben Glover, Crystal Lewis, David Garcia, Tim Timmons songwriters
 Jazz/Blues Album of the Year: The Dark Threads - Suzanne Vaartstra
 Jazz/Blues Song of the Year: "Jubilation" - Johnny Summers
 Male Vocalist of The Year: Greg Sykes
 New Artist of The Year: Brooke Nicholls
 Pop Album of the Year: Eternally Grateful - Warren Dean Flandez
 Pop Song of the Year: "First Day of My Life" - The Color. James Shiels, Jordan Janzen and Bryan Fowler songwriters
 Praise & Worship Album of The Year: Benediction (Live) - The City Harmonic
 Praise & Worship Song of The Year: "Honestly" - Elias Dummer. Elias Dummer, Anadara Arnold and Carl Cartee songwriters
 Producer of The Year: Drew Brown
 Recorded Song of The Year: "Surprise" - The Color
 Rock Album of the Year: Uprising - The Informants
 Rock Song of the Year: "House of Cards" - Manafest
 Seasonal Album of The Year: O Night Divine - Drew Brown
 Seasonal Song of The Year: "Hallelujah For the Cross" - Drew Brown
 Song of The Year: "Overhead Projector" - Tim Neufeld and Ryan McAllister
 Southern Gospel/Country Album of The Year: Plum Coulee, My Home - Rosemary Siemens & The Sweet Sound Revival
 Urban/Rap Album of The Year: Eternally Grateful - Warren Dean Flandez
 Urban/Rap Song of The Year: "Pressure" - Landry
 Video of The Year: "Reverse" - Greg Sykes

 GMA Canada 2019 Covenant Award Winners / 40th Annual 

 Album of the Year: First Day of My Life - The Color
 Artist of the Year: The Color
 Album Artwork Design of The Year: Grateful - Brian Doerksen. Design by Roberta Landreth
 Collaboration of The Year: "My Soul Is Spoken For" - Infinitely More feat Drew Brown)
 Female Vocalist of The Year: Brooke Nicholls
 Group of The Year: The Color
 Male Vocalist of The Year: Jordan St. Cyr
 New Artist of The Year: Jordan St.Cyr
 Producer of The Year: Roy Salmond
 Radio Single of The Year: "Let It Be Love" - The Color
 Recorded Song of The Year: "In My Lifetime" - Jordan St.Cyr
 Song of The Year: "In My Lifetime" - Jordan St.Cyr. Jordan St. Cyr and Ben Calhoun songwriters
 Video of The Year: "Let It Be Love" - The Color
 GMA Canada Legacy Award: Vineyard Music Canada
 Children's Album of The Year: Break Free - Q-Town
 Country / Southern Gospel Album of The Year: There Is More - Canada's Double Portion
 Folk Album of The Year: The Beauty of the One - Infinitely More
 Francophone Album of The Year: Amour - Mylen Quéry
 Gospel Album of The Year: Speak - Warren Dean Flandez
 Inspirational Album of The Year: Grateful - Brian Doerksen
 Instrumental Album of The Year: Amazing Grace - Songs of Inspiration - Steve Wingfield
 Pop/Rock Album of The Year: First Day of My Life - The Color
 Praise & Worship Album of The Year: What Is A Mountain - C4 Worship
 Urban/Rap Album of The Year: Speak - Warren Dean Flandez
 Seasonal Album of The Year: Beauty Bright - Drew Brown
 Children's Song of The Year: "Even More" - Brad Guldemond & Greg Sykes
 Country Song of The Year: "Heavenly Harvest" - Rosemary Siemens and the Sweet Sound Revival. Rosemary Siemens, Billy Sprague and Joe Beck songwriters
 Folk Song of The Year: "Scars on His Hands" - Brian Doerksen
 Francophone Song of The Year: "À La Croix" - Sandie M
 Gospel Song of The Year: "If Jesus Is The Face of God" - Brian Doerksen & Jaylene Johnson
 Inspirational Song of The Year: "I Will Sing" - Mat Crisp. Mat Crisp, Joanna Lafleur, Steve Lensink, Brooke Nicholls and Chris Vacher songwriters
 Instrumental Song of The Year: "Shadows & Light" - Drew Brown
 Jazz/Blues Song of The Year: "My God, He Said" - Johnny Summers
 Pop Song of The Year: "In My Lifetime" - Jordan St.Cyr. Jordan St.Cyr and Ben Calhoun songwriters
 Praise & Worship Song of The Year: "No Greater Love (How Marvelous)" - Greg Sykes & Darren Mulligan
 Rap Song of The Year: "Good Friday" - Drew Brown. Drew Brown and Cyril Guerette songwriters
 Rock Song of The Year: "The Other Side" - Matt Adams
 Seasonal Song of The Year: "A Merry Christmas To You" - Derin Bello & Andrew Horrocks
 Southern Gospel Song of The Year: "Hands" - Christina Hemmerling, Debbie Hemmerling, Duncan A Hemmerling
 Urban Song of The Year: "Face The Waves" - Chelsea Amber. Chelsea Amber and Nate Savage songwriters.r

 GMA Canada 2020 Covenant Award Winners / 41st Annual 

 Album of the Year: Wherever I Go - Dan Bremnes
 Artist of the Year: The Color
 Female Vocalist of the Year: Brooke Nicholls
 Male Vocalist of the Year: Dan Bremnes
 Group of the Year: The Color
 Breakthrough Artist of the Year: Elias Dummer
 Producer of the Year: Steve Lensink
 Song of the Year: "Wherever I Go" - Dan Bremnes. Dan Bremnes and Bryan Fowler songwriters
 Radio Single of the Year: "Wherever I Go" - Dan Bremnes
 Recorded Song of the Year: "Wherever I Go" - Dan Bremnes
 Collaboration of the Year: The Kind of Man Remix - Neon Feather
 Album Artwork Design of the Year: Resurrection Sound - C4 Worship. Emily Banks, Joanna la Fleur and Landon Wideman designers
 Video of the Year: "Wherever I Go" - Dan Bremnes
 Country/Southern Gospel Album of the Year: Open Book - The Daze's
 Folk Album of the Year: Slow Down - Kyle Church
 Gospel Album of the Year: It's Not Over Live - Powerhouse Fellowship Soul Choir featuring Shawn Cotterell
 Indigenous Album of the Year: Tired of Basic - LoveCollide (released 2018)
 Instrumental Album of the Year: Christmas Presence - Steve Wingfield (released 2018)
 Pop/Rock Album of the Year: Face the Waves - Chelsea Amber (released 2018)
 Praise & Worship Album of the Year: Resurrection Sound - C4 Worship
 Rap / Urban Album of the Year: The Flight of the Hummingbird - Fresh I.E.
 Seasonal Album of the Year: X'' - Hymns for the Architect (released 2018)
 Children's Song of the Year: "You And Me" - Rosemary Siemens & Jaylene Johnson
 Country/Southern Gospel Song of the Year: "Trust You" - Lindsey Minaker (released 2018)
 Folk Song of the Year: "How Long" - Jaylene Johnson (released 2016)
 Gospel Song of the Year: "Brought Me Through"  - Reynaldo Dames, Andrae Crouch (d.2015)
 Indigenous Song of the Year: "Undeniable"  - (LoveCollide) (released 2018)
 Inspirational Song of the Year: "Pursue" - Brooke Nicholls
 Instrumental Song of the Year: "You Say" - Lauren Daigle, arrangement by Rosemary Siemens & Eli Bennett (released 2018)
 Jazz/Blues Song of the Year: "Love Letter" - Chelsea Amber & Meaghan Smith (released 2018)
 Pop Song of the Year: "The Kind of Man" - The Color - Jeff Pardo, James Shiels and Jordan Janzen songwriters
 Praise & Worship Song of the Year: "Turn My Eyes" - Brooke Nicholls
 Rap/Urban Song of the Year: "It's Not Over"  - Fresh I.E. feat Illa (d. 2016) |  Robert "Fresh I.E." Wilson, Matthew Jarvis
 Rock Song of the Year: "Us and Them" - Amy Savin & Josh Porter
 Seasonal Song of the Year: "It's Christmas Time" - Brant Pethick, Jaylene Johnson (released 2018)
  GMA Canada Song Hall of Fame: "Seize The Day" - Carolyn Arends (released April 18, 2000)
  GMA Canada Song Hall of Fame: "You Are My Wholeness" - Roy Salmond & Mike Mulder (released 1981)

See also 

 Music of Canada
 List of religion-related awards

References

External links 
 

Canadian music awards
Christian music awards
Gospel music awards
Lifetime achievement awards
Awards established in 1974